Muriicola marianensis is a Gram-negative, aerobic, rod-shaped and non-motile bacterium from the genus of Muriicola which has been isolated from seawater from the Mariana Trench.

References

Flavobacteria
Bacteria described in 2015